Intelsat V F-3, then named Intelsat 503, was a communications satellite operated by COMSAT. Launched on 15 December 1981, it was the third of fifteen Intelsat V satellites to be launched. The Intelsat V series was constructed by Ford Aerospace, based on the Intelsat V satellite bus. Intelsat V F-3 was part of an advanced series of satellites designed to provide greater telecommunications capacity for Intelsat's global network.

Satellite 
The satellite was box-shaped, measuring 1.66 by 2.1 by 1.77 metres; solar arrays spanned 15.9 metres tip to tip. The arrays, supplemented by nickel-hydrogen batteries during eclipse, provided 1800 watts of power. The payload housed 21 C-band and 4 Ku-band transponders. It could accommodate 15,000 two-way voice circuits and two TV channels simultaneously. It had a launch mass of 1928 kg. The satellite was deactivated in January 1998.

Launch 
The satellite was successfully launched into space on 15 December 1981 at 23:35:00 UTC, by means of an Atlas SLV-3D Centaur-D1AR vehicle from the Cape Canaveral Air Force Station, Florida, United States.

See also 

 1981 in spaceflight

References 

Spacecraft launched in 1981
Intelsat satellites
1981 in spaceflight